Floods in the United States (2000–present) is a list of flood events which were of significant impact to the country during the 21st century, since 2000. Floods are generally caused by excessive rainfall, excessive snowmelt, storm surge from hurricanes, and dam failure.

Decade of the 2000s

November 2000 Hawaii floods

Tropical Storm Paul formed on October 25 from the Intertropical Convergence Zone (ITCZ) to the southwest of Mexico, and it dissipated four days later without becoming a significant tropical cyclone. The remnants of Paul reached the Hawaiian Islands in early November 2000, and interacted with an upper-level low, dropping very heavy rains from November 1 to 3.

Tropical Storm Allison floods in Louisiana and Texas – June 2001

The remains of the tropical cyclone sat and spun over eastern Texas for several days before moving eastward just inland of the Gulf coast. Heavy rains fell along the western Gulf coast that week, with storm totals of near 940 mm (37 in) near Houston and 1041mm (41 in) west of Beaumont. Damage from the storm was estimated near US$6 billion (2001 dollars), and 41 perished from the flood.

Los Angeles County Flood of 2005

Hurricane Katrina (2005) storm surge – Louisiana and Mississippi

A large Category 3 hurricane at landfall along the southeast tip of Louisiana, strong northerly flow behind Katrina caused breaks and failures in the levees that protected the lower Ninth Ward and along other canals in New Orleans, flooding 80 percent of the city for nearly a month. The mouth of the Mississippi River saw breaks in its levee system due to storm surge. In Mississippi, a massive storm surge destroyed most structures along the coast including floating casinos, and preliminary figures show that the storm surge was higher than in Hurricane Camille of 1969. There were 1,836 fatalities, mostly from flooding.

Mid-Atlantic and New England Flood – October 2005

The combination of a moisture fetch set up by Subtropical Depression 22 and Tropical Storm Tammy, as well as an additional tropical disturbance which rode up a stationary frontal zone, set up excessive rains from coastal sections of the Mid-Atlantic states through southern New England. In New Hampshire, the Monadnock region was affected, with Alstead among the hardest hit as 300 mm (12 in) of rain fell within 30 hours, allowing this month to be the wettest in the history of the Granite State. It was considered a once in 500-year flood event.

Ka Loko Reservoir – March 2006

Prolonged rainfall fell across Hawaii between February 19 and April 2, 2006, as upper-level cyclones kept closing off northwest of the archipelago, virtually eliminating their normal trade winds, and bringing some of the wettest conditions seen in the state since March 1951. Four of the cyclones were kona lows. The heavy rain event of March 1 to 3 brought severe flooding to the east-facing slopes of the Koolau Range in Oahu, with 571 mm (22.47 in) falling in two days at Punalu'u. During the next rain event from March 8 to 11, many of the larger islands received significant amounts of rainfall. Flash flooding occurred in Maakua Stream, and severe inundation affected communities from Laie to Kahana. As much as 356 mm (14 in) of rain fell over north Kauai, forcing the closure of Kuhio Highway at the Hanalei Bridge for the second time in 24 hours. 150–255 mm (6–10 in)of rain fell upon the southeast-facing slopes of the Big Island causing numerous road closures in Hilo. North and east Kauai received 200–300 mm (8–12 in) of rain over a 3-day period. Mount Waialeale recorded over 711 mm (28 in) during this 4-day period. The Kauai Marriott Resort suffered significant damage due to the overflow of Keonaawanui Stream during the early morning hours of March 11. The third significant rain event between March 13 and 18 was too much for Ka Loko Dam in northeast Kauai, which failed in the early morning of March 14. The wall of water swept away homes and structures and resulted in 3 confirmed deaths and 4 persons missing. Repeated thunderstorms and heavy rains produced numerous road closures from flooding and inundated many properties.

Mid-Atlantic Flood – June 2006

A stalled frontal boundary, a tropical connection, and a developing tropical disturbance led to heavy rains across the Mid-Atlantic and Northeast, particularly in central Maryland and Pennsylvania during late June.  Rainfall amounts ranged up to 430 mm (17 in) during the several days of heavy rain.  There was threat of dam failure around an earthen dam around Lake Needwood in eastern Montgomery County, Maryland, due to the deluge.

Western Gulf Coast flood – October 2006

A trio of heavy rainfall events, on October 14–17, October 18–19, and again from October 26–27 set the stage for moderate to significant flooding across portions of eastern Texas, Louisiana, as well as portions of Arkansas and Mississippi. This was the wettest spell for the region since T.S. Allison of the 1989 Atlantic hurricane season. Two of these events were fed by tropical cyclones from the 2006 Pacific Hurricane Season, Norman and Paul, which affected western Mexico.  Each rainfall event led to localized maxima in excess of 250 mm (10 in), and helped break a dry spell across the region.  Localized totals ranged up to 711 mm (28 in) near Kountze, Texas during the 13-day period from October 14 through October 27.

Washington State Flood – November 2006
Severe flooding in Washington state closed Mount Rainier National Park and damaged several mountain towns, including North Bend.

2007 Midwest flooding – August 2007

A stalled frontal boundary stretching from Iowa to Ohio was the focus for several rounds of heavy rainfall resulting in flash flooding the week August 18 – August 25, 2007.  Minnesota, Iowa, Wisconsin, Illinois, Indiana and Ohio were the states hardest hit.  Across the six states, 18 counties were declared federal disaster areas.  Numerous rainfall records, both for most rain in the month of August as well as 24-hour rainfall totals were recorded.  Over 457 mm (18 in) of rain was recorded in some locations during this week.  At least $100 million in damages has been reported in Minnesota and Wisconsin alone, and 18 people were killed.

2007 Oregon and Washington floods – December 2007

Flooding occurred in Oregon and Washington along with high winds. Interstate 5 was both closed and damaged.

2008 Midwest flooding – Spring 2008

Flooding occurred in the midwest part of the United States.

June 2008 Midwest Flood

Extensive flooding is occurring or has occurred on the Wabash, White, Zumbro, Kickapoo, Wisconsin, Baraboo, Cedar, Crawfish, Fox, Iowa, Rock, and Des Moines rivers, as well as the upper Mississippi River, leading to extensive flooding in Iowa, Wisconsin, Indiana, Minnesota, Michigan, and Missouri.

July–August 2008 Alaska Flood

Spring 2009 Red River Flood

In 2009, a record flood caused extensive damages along the Red River of the North, affecting the areas of Fargo-Moorhead, Wahpeton-Breckenridge, and Grand Forks between the Minnesota–North Dakota border, as well as Winnipeg and its surroundings in Manitoba, Canada.

September 2009 Southern Flood

A major rain event from September 16 through 22, which brought over ten inches of rain to the Atlanta, Birmingham, Chattanooga, Athens areas as well as other parts of the states of Alabama, Georgia, Tennessee and North Carolina. As of September 22, 2009, in Atlanta, 9 people had been killed due to the floods.

Decade of the 2010s

March 2010 Southern New England Flood
A major rainfall event which lasted from March 1-30 which brought twelve inches of rain and flooded the Pawtuxet River, Blackstone River and numerous other ocean , lakes, ponds and streams in Rhode Island.  The flooding was the worst in Rhode Island history, as the Pawtuxet River crested over 69 feet—12 feet above flood stage, shattering the previous record by several feet.  The rainstorm, which occurred during the cool, dry season, added 8.79" to an already rainy March.  At 16.34" of rain, it was the wettest month on record for Rhode Island. A seasonal high tide led to severe coastal flooding in Bristol, Rhode Island; four of Rhode Island's counties were declared emergency disaster zones.  The Warwick Mall in Warwick was flooded with 20 inches of water, leaving hundreds of employees out of work. A sewage treatment plant in the area failed, contaminating the rainwater with raw sewage.  Hundreds of homes in Warwick, Cranston and Johnston were flooded with over a foot of contaminated water. Many towns in Southeastern Massachusetts were also affected by the flood.

May 2010 Tennessee floods

The May 2010 Tennessee floods were 1000-year floods in Middle Tennessee, West Tennessee, south-central and western Kentucky and northern Mississippi as the result of torrential rains on May 1–2, 2010. Floods from these rains affected the area for several days afterwards, resulting in thirty-one deaths and widespread property damage totaling $2.3 billion.

September 2010 Minnesota/Wisconsin Flood

Flash floods put towns underwater and forced evacuations in Minnesota and Wisconsin. A strong system caused the heavy rain and flash flooding in the Upper Midwest. Some of the worse flooding came a week after the flood. Near record stage on the Minnesota river in New Ulm, Mankato, St Peter, Jordan, Shakopee, Savage, and breaking records in Henderson. Records were also broken on the Cannon River and the Zumbro River.

2011 Missouri River Flood

The 2011 Missouri River floods was a flooding event on the Missouri River in the United States, in May and June that year. The flooding was triggered by record snowfall in the Rocky Mountains of Montana and Wyoming along with near-record spring rainfall in central and eastern Montana. All six major dams along the Missouri River released record amounts of water to prevent overflow which led to flooding threatening several towns and cities along the river from Montana to Missouri; in particular Bismarck, North Dakota; Pierre, South Dakota; Dakota Dunes, South Dakota; South Sioux City, Nebraska, Sioux City, Iowa; Omaha, Nebraska; Council Bluffs, Iowa; Kansas City, Missouri; Jefferson City, Missouri, as well as putting many smaller towns at risk. According to the National Weather Service, in the second half of the month of May 2011, almost a year's worth of rain fell over the upper Missouri River basin. Extremely heavy rainfall in conjunction with an estimated 212 percent of normal snowpack in the Rocky Mountains contributed to this flooding event.

Spring 2011 Mississippi River Floods

Two of the most deadly tornado outbreaks in U.S. history combined with spring snowmelt cause the Mississippi to swell to record levels. Missouri, Illinois, Tennessee, Arkansas, Mississippi, and Louisiana were affected, and the western counties of Kentucky, Tennessee, and Mississippi were declared federal disaster areas. The Birds Point-New Madrid Floodway was put into use for the first time since 1937. Nine floodgates of the Morganza Spillway were opened, marking the first use of the gates since the 1973 flood. 330 of the Bonnet Carré Spillway's gates were opened to save the levees protecting New Orleans. There was concern that if the Old River Control Structure, the Morganza Spillway, or the Bonnet Carré Spillway failed, the Mississippi River could change its course, flowing either into the Atchafalaya Basin or Lake Pontchartrain.

September 2011 Mid-Atlantic Flooding

US Midwest floods 2013

Heavy rainfall, severe thunderstorms, and flash flooding occurred across several Midwest states in April 2013. Heavy rain fell after moist air surged ahead of a strong cold front and low-pressure system, leaving many rivers swollen. As much as 8 inches of rainfall fell in some places. Flood warnings were in effect from Michigan to northern Arkansas and Tennessee. As of April 22, more than 200 gauges were in flood stage along rivers in the upper Midwest, including 43 in "major" flood stage. The floods have been responsible for five fatalities.

By May 29, the statewide average rainfall in Iowa had reached 16.4 inches, making it the wettest spring in the 141 years of recorded climate data for the state. On the same day, the University of Iowa began installing Hesco bastions around low-lying campus buildings, in anticipation of flooding on the Iowa River.
On May 30, because of continued rain, the U.S. Army Corps of Engineers increased the outflow from the Coralville Reservoir to 14,000 cubic feet per second, leading Iowa City to declare a civil emergency and forcing the closure of low-lying portions of North Dubuque Street, a major route for commuter traffic into Iowa City. By June 1, the outflow from Coralville Reservoir had been increased to 18,000 cubic feet per second with the control gates fully opened, putting an estimated 50–60 structures at risk of inundation. The Cedar River crested in Cedar Rapids, Iowa early on June 2, reaching the 10th highest level ever recorded.  The river briefly forced the closure of the Edgewood Road Bridge, but the city's flood defences prevented additional damage. On June 13, water levels of the Coralville reservoir had finally fallen to the point where the Corps of Engineers was able to reduce the outflow to 14,000 cubic feet per second, and Iowa City was able to reopen North Dubuque Street on Sunday, June 16.

September 2013 Colorado floods

During the week starting September 9, a slow moving cold front stalled over Colorado, clashing with warm humid monsoonal air from the south. This resulted in rain and flooding along Colorado's Front Range from Colorado Springs north to Fort Collins.  The situation intensified on September 11 and 12.  Worst hit was Boulder County, with up to 21 inches of rain recorded.  At least 6 deaths along the Front Range have been attributed to the flooding, and evacuations took place in many low-lying areas.  The town of Lyons in Boulder County was isolated by the flooding of the St. Vrain River, and several earth dams along the Front Range burst or were overtopped. As of late September 13, according to the Office of Emergency Management, there were 172 people unaccounted for and at least 3 dead in flood area of Boulder County.

2014 Gulf Coast Flood 

On April 29–30, 2014, a slow-moving cold front associated with a tornado outbreak in the Deep South dumped a record setting amount of rainfall, inundating the western Florida Panhandle and Southwest Alabama. Pensacola was estimated to have received as much as 26 inches of rain in only 25 hours, with 5.68 inches of it falling in only an hour at Pensacola International Airport. A landslide caused a major portion of Scenic Highway in Pensacola to collapse into the bay it overlooks. Areas east of Pensacola received as much as 15–20 inches of rain, peaking at 20.39 inches in Milton and 14.15 inches at Mary Esther. The majority of this rainfall occurred in a time period of about 9 hours on the morning of April 30. In Alabama, rainfall amounts peaked at 23.67 inches in Orange Beach, and 17.20 inches in Mobile.

2014 Southeastern Michigan flood 
Many freeways across the area were heavily flooded, especially the Interstate 75/Interstate 696 interchange in Madison Heights, Michigan. Damage from the storm totaled $1.8 billion. In addition, two people were killed.

2014 New York flood 
Record setting rainfall presenting 60 days of precipitation fell from the same system that precipitated the 2014 Southeastern Michigan flood two days earlier on suburbs of New York City. In a single hour between 5am and 6am in Islip, over  fell, including  in 9 minutes. One person was killed. Portions of Interstate 495, New York State Route 27 and New York State Route 135 closed. A baseball game at Yankee Stadium between the New York Yankees and Baltimore Orioles was postponed. Damage was at least $35.2 million. Further south, flash flooding warning were issued in the Washington–Baltimore combined statistical area, with the Baltimore Harbor Tunnel and parts of the Baltimore Beltway closed due to flooding.

2014 Arizona flood 

A record setting rainfall event deposited close to 3 inches of precipitation on the area, breaking the old record set in 1933.

2015 Texas-Oklahoma flood 

Weeks of heavy rain caused by a slow-moving front resulted in devastating floods across much of Texas and Oklahoma during the week of May 24, 2015. Most notably, the town of Wimberley, Texas, along with a significant portion of Hays County was devastated when the Blanco River rose to almost 30 feet above flood stage overnight. Later that week, Houston also experienced widespread flash flooding in highly populated portions of the city as well.

2015 Louisiana flood 
The 2015 Louisiana floods took place during June 2015.  The Red River of the South flooded parts of northern Louisiana.  The Red River reached its highest level in over 70 years during the floods.

2015 Utah floods 

Heavy rain from the remnants of Hurricane Linda fell over southern Utah, causing flash floods in Zion National Park and the town of Hildale. The floods killed between 16 and 20 people.

2015 Missouri floods 

in December 2015, major floods occurred in Missouri.

March 2016 Southern and Midwestern floods 
In early March 2016, a dip in the jet stream and collection of moisture from the gulf caused a large, slow-moving weather system that produced torrential rains and severe weather as it made its way from Texas into the Mississippi Valley. On March 8, the storm hit northwest Louisiana, where it proceeded to create huge flood events in the area near Shreveport. Many neighborhoods around Red Chute Bayou and Flat River in Bossier Parish were quickly inundated and evacuated. In the neighborhood of Golden Meadows in Bossier City, the rapid rainfall overwhelmed storm drains and left people stranded in their homes with up to four feet of water in some areas. As the storm later moved east, the rest of North Louisiana was heavily impacted with up to twenty five inches of rain recorded in some areas such as Monroe. There were also many areas in other states such as Illinois, Texas, Oklahoma, Mississippi, Missouri, and Tennessee severely affected by this storm. Five deaths are directly attributed to this storm, and over 3500 people have been displaced.

April 2016 Houston floods 

In April 2016, Houston, Texas was flooded with over one foot of rain in 24 hours.

May 2016 Oklahoma floods 

The 2016 Oklahoma floods set precipitation records in both Texas and Oklahoma.

June 2016 West Virginia floods 

One of the deadliest floods in state history, and deadliest flash flood in U.S. history since the 2010 Tennessee Floods was caused by 8 to 10 inches of rainfall in over a 12-hour period. 23 people perished from the floods, and hardest hit counties include Greenbrier, Kanawha, Jackson, and Ohio.

July 2016 Maryland floods 

Significant flash flooding affected the Baltimore Metropolitan Area, and especially hard hit was Ellicott City where up to six inches of rain fell within two hours. Two people were killed and significant damage was wrought to the historic downtown district of Ellicott City.

2016 Louisiana floods 

In August 2016, prolonged rainfall from an unpredictable storm resulted in catastrophic flooding in Louisiana. Louisiana governor John Bel Edwards called the disaster a "historic, unprecedented flooding event" and declared a state of emergency. Many rivers and waterways, particularly the Amite and Comite rivers, reached record levels, and rainfall exceeded 20 inches (510 mm) in multiple parishes. At least 60 people were killed and total damages exceeded $10 billion.

2017 California floods 

The 2017 California floods were a series of floods that affected parts of California in the first half of 2017. Northern California saw its wettest winter in almost a century, breaking the previous record set in the winter of 1982–83. Flooding related to the same storm systems also impacted parts of western Nevada and southern Oregon. Damage to California roads and highways alone was estimated at over $1.05 billion and at least 5 people were killed as a result of the floods.

2017 Florida floods

From August 23–28, 2017, Potential Tropical Cyclone Ten's precursor stalled over Florida, causing the worst flooding the state had seen in at least 20 years. Fort Myers and other areas in southwestern Florida were the hardest-hit, forcing the evacuation of more than 200 people. The system killed two people in Florida and caused more than $1.923 million (2017 USD) in damages.

Less than two weeks later, Hurricane Irma made landfall in southwestern Florida on September 10, bringing additional flooding to the region, causing significantly more damage in the state.

July 2017 Payson floods

One of the deadliest floods to ever hit Gila County, Arizona. The floods hit a popular hiking trail near the town of Payson which killed 10 people, including 5 children.

2017 Southeastern Texas and Southern Louisiana floods

Hurricane Harvey stalled over southeastern Texas, dropping over five feet of rain in some places, causing major flooding, especially in the Houston metropolitan area and the Beaumont–Port Arthur metropolitan area.

2018 Ohio River floods
This flooding caused six people to die. Damage totalled $500 million. In September 2018, record rainfalls caused extensive flash flooding, with one casualty reported.

April 2018 Hawaii floods

In April 2018, a series of thunderstorms produced record-breaking rainfall on the Hawaiian Islands of Kauaʻi and Oahu. An upper-level low moved across the area on April 13, generating a mesoscale convective system that moved over eastern Oahu, producing localized heavy rainfall that reached .

August 2018 Hawaii floods

Hurricane Lane produced record-breaking rain across the Hawaiian Islands. The resulting floods and landslides caused extensive damage and one fatality. More than 3,000 insurance claims for damage were made statewide and total economic losses exceeded $250 million. This made Lane the wettest tropical cyclone on record in the state of Hawaii, surpassing the previous peak of  during Hurricane Hiki in 1950. Lane's peak rainfall total was also the second-highest recorded from a tropical cyclone within the United States, surpassed only by Hurricane Harvey in the preceding year.

September 2018 Carolinas floods

A combination of storm surge flooding and rainfall, over two and a half feet in some parts of North Carolina, when Hurricane Florence stalled over southeastern North Carolina led to severe flooding, with some rivers cresting almost two weeks after Florence's landfall.

Mississippi River Floods of 2019 

The conterminous United States recorded the wettest meteorological winter (December 2018 – February 2019) during the 1895–2019 period of record.  Most portions of the Mississippi River experienced significant, prolonged flooding during the winter, spring, and summer of 2019.  The duration of flooding exceeded records set by the Great Mississippi River Flood of 1927 at some locations along the Lower Mississippi River.  The Bonnet Carre' Spillway was operated for the first time in two consecutive years and operated twice in the same year for the first time.

March 2019 Nebraska floods

64 of 93 counties in Nebraska declared a state of emergency and at least three people died. 14 bridges needed replacing or major work.

Decade of the 2020s

2020 Southeast Alaska floods
According to National Weather Service in Juneau, December 1, 2020, was a recording-breaking day. A single-day rainfall caused flooding and landslides in the region. Around 2,000 people lived in the area. Four houses were destroyed, and 2 people died. The U.S. Coast Guard sent a helicopter and boat to the location for avoiding further damages. Damage amounted to nearly $30 million from the storm.

March 2021 Nashville floods 

In Nashville, heavy rainfall caused a flash-flood, killing 6 men in their sixties and seventies and 1 woman in her forties. It was reported that most of the fatalities occurred while the victims were in their cars.

March 2021 Hawaii floods

In March 2021, a cut off upper-level low brought torrential rainfall to Hawaii, triggering severe flooding across the islands of Oahu, Maui, and Kauai.

May 2021 Alabama floods 
In early May 2021, in Alabama and the Southeastern United States, a deluge caused moderate flooding and spawned at least three tornadoes. After the deluge had passed, it was reported that there had been no fatalities, but that damage occurred in Georgia, Texas, Alabama, Mississippi and Virginia, and that debris must be cleaned up when it is safe to do so, and the waterline has receded to manageable levels. It was reported that Alabama received as much rain as they normally would in one month, during the span of a single day.

May 2021 Louisiana floods 
Rainfall in the areas around Lake Charles, Louisiana caused severe flooding, and killed four people. 3 people were found to have drowned in their cars, and another person drowned after crashing their car into a ditch. A flood warning was issued by Baton Rouge authorities. Torrential rains were recorded to have been at three times the normal level, and water levels in the region are the third highest they've been since flood records started in the area in 1895. The water levels are seconded only by the effects of Hurricane Delta in 2020.

June 2021 Southeastern Michigan flood
Late on June 25 into early June 26 an rainband set up across Washtenaw County and Wayne County, the local weather radar estimated that some areas in Detroit received  of rain. Local highways like Interstate 75, Interstate 94, and Interstate 96 were flooded, and hundreds of cars were left stranded, also some basements of people's homes in the area flooded.

July 2021 Bucks County flood 
On July 12, heavy rainfall across southeastern Pennsylvania and New Jersey, mainly Bucks County. Cities including Bensalem, Croydon, and Bristol Township experienced flash flooding, caused by many inches of rain. The residents at Lafayette Condos in Bensalem had to be evacuated from their homes.

July 2021 Arizona flood 
On July 14, flash flooding occurred in Flagstaff, Coconino County, Arizona. The flooding was worsened by ground softening caused by recent and ongoing wildfires in Arizona, and in the United States, which in turn, were sparked by a heatwave and drought. One woman was killed after she was swept up in a current, as she was rafting in the Grand Canyon. Flagstaff declared a state of emergency due to the unexpected amount of flooding.

August 2021 Tennessee floods

On the morning of August 21, storms riding along a stationary front in western Middle Tennessee produced widespread flash flooding across the counties of Stewart, Houston, Dickson, Humphreys, and Hickman. Especially hard hit were the towns of McEwen and Waverly in Humphreys County, where many homes and businesses were destroyed by floodwaters along Trace Creek. Twenty people were killed throughout Humphreys County from the flooding.

September 2021 Northeastern United States floods

Hurricane Ida's extratropical remnants triggered severe flooding across the Northeastern United States from September 1 to 2. The flooding killed 54 people and caused between $16 billion and $24 billion in damage.

June 2022 Montana floods 

Large areas of Montana, including Yellowstone National Park, were affected by heavy flooding in June 2022.

July-August 2022 nationwide floods

Beginning on July 24, 2022, and lasting for a week, many flash flooding events hit several areas of the United States. These areas included parts of Missouri and Illinois, especially Greater St. Louis, Eastern Kentucky, Southwest Virginia, parts of West Virginia, and the Las Vegas Valley. Several rounds of severe thunderstorms began in Missouri on July 24, culminating during July 25 and 26, when St. Louis broke its previous 1915 record for the most rainfall in a span of 24 hours. Governor Mike Parson declared a state of emergency on July 26. Over one hundred people were rescued from floods, and two people were killed. Late on July 27 and into July 28, historic flooding began in central Appalachia, particularly in Kentucky, where a state of emergency was declared. A total of 38 people were killed in Kentucky as a direct result of flooding, with a 39th fatality occurring days later during cleanup efforts and a 40th coming in September during cleanup efforts in Pike County.

Late July 28, another unprecedented flash flooding event occurred in Las Vegas after parts of the city saw over an inch of rainfall. Much of the Las Vegas Strip became inundated, with roads, casinos, and parking garages being affected and flights being delayed or cancelled. More flooding continued from July 30 to August 1 in Arizona, including Phoenix and Flagstaff, California, including Death Valley National Park, and again in the same areas of Eastern Kentucky. In all, 41 people were killed during the flooding events: 39 in Kentucky on July 28 and 2 in Missouri on July 26.

More flooding events continued throughout August, impacting areas such as Death Valley, the Dallas–Fort Worth metroplex, and central Mississippi. A flash flood in Zion National Park in Utah led to one fatality. The Dallas flooding on August 22 led to an additional fatality and four injuries.

See also

 Floods in the United States before 1900
 Floods in the United States (1900–1999)
 United States tropical cyclone rainfall climatology

References

21st
2000s floods
2010s floods
2020s floods
2000s floods in the United States
2010s floods in the United States
2020s floods in the United States
2001 beginnings